NBPP may refer to:
 New Black Panther Party
 Netherlands Bioinformatics for Proteomics Platform

pt:NBIC